Kalali is a village and administrative unit with a democratically elected panchayat samiti (local council) in the Loharu (Vidhan Sabha constituency), Siwani Tehsil of Bhiwani District under Bhiwani-Mahendragarh Lok Sabha constituency and Hisar Division of Haryana state.

History

Kalali came into existence even before its twin village Bidhwan.

Bidhwan Jaglan Zail and Jaglan Lambardari

Bidhwan is seat of the former Jaglan Zail that was headed by the Zaildar from influential Jaglan clan who during the British Raj ruled over four revenue villages of Princely state called Loharu State. Descendants of whom still live in the village and their descendant Surender Singh Jaglan still holds the position of Lambardar of these villages. Currently, these four villages of Bidhwan (बिधवाण), Kalali (कलाली), Mandholi Khurd  (मंढोली खुर्द) and Mandholi Kalan (मंढोलीकलां) lie in Bhiwani district.
Khunga or Jaglan gotra Jats and Kaaushik gotra Brahmins were original inhabitants of Kalali village.

Nearby archaeological sites
Nearby Indus Valley civilization archaeological sites are Banawali, Lohari Ragho, Masudpur, Rakhigarhi, Siswal all with Hissar district as well as Burj and Bhirrana and Kunal and Balu in Fatehabad and Mitathal and Naurangabad in Bhiwani district. Another archaeological site is Agroha Mound.

Administration
Currently, it is under Bhiwani Zilla Panchayat and has its own unreserved Gram Panchayat under Gram Panchayat Smiti. There is a Patwari (government land record officer), an ADO (Agriculture Development Officer),a Rural Health Officer (RHO), and an Anganbadi Worker.

The village is inhabited by people belonging to different castes. The dominant caste in the village is Jat where Jaglan (Khunga) is dominant gotra.

Brahman & Jat gotras 
The following [[Brahman & Jat gotras are  found in the village:

 kaushik
 Khunga  
Jaglan gotra dominates the Jat community in the village

Transportation
It is well connected by the paved bitumen road. It lies from 9 km Jhumpa Khurd, 18 km  Bahal, 21 km Siwani, 29  Rajgarh (Rajasthan), 33  Kairu, 55 km Hissar, 57 km Hansi, 49 km Pilani, 50 km from Bhiwani, 163 km Delhi and 282 km from state capital Chandigarh.

Train connectivity
Nearest train stations are 9 km Jhumpa Khurd, 18 km  Bahal, 21 km Siwani, 29  Rajgarh.

Airport connectivity
Currently no commercial flights from this airport.

See also

 Bidhwan
 Badya Jattan
 Kanwari
 Zaildar
 List of Zaildars by Zail

References

External links
 Google location map

 Haryana Government e-Services
 Bhiwani District Website
 e-Disha e-services
 Government of India e-services

Villages in Bhiwani district
Archaeological sites in Haryana